Smokey and the Bandit Part 3 is a 1983 American action comedy film and a second and final sequel to Smokey and the Bandit (1977) and Smokey and the Bandit II (1980), starring Jackie Gleason, Jerry Reed, Paul Williams, Pat McCormick, Mike Henry and Colleen Camp. The film also includes a cameo near the end by the original Bandit, Burt Reynolds.

With one of the main titular characters missing, the plot of the film revolves instead around Sheriff Buford T. Justice ("Smokey"), with the presence of the Bandit merely being suggested through him being impersonated by Cledus ("Snowman").

The film received negative reviews and was a box office bomb.

Plot
Big Enos and Little Enos offer retiring Sheriff Buford T. Justice a wager, betting $250,000 against his badge on his ability to transport a large stuffed fish from Florida to Texas. Buford rejects the wager and retires, but goes through all sorts of mishaps before finally realizing retirement is not all it is cracked up to be and accepting the Enoses' wager. Buford picks up the fish and starts driving with his son, Junior.

The Enoses set many traps, but Buford dodges all of them, so they try to hire the Bandit to intercept him. Agreeing that the original Bandit is too hard to manage, they hire the Snowman to act as the Bandit. The new Snowman/Bandit parks his truck so he can drive a black and gold 1983 Pontiac Trans Am.

The Bandit picks up Dusty, who quits her job at a used car dealership. The Bandit catches up with Buford and steals the fish with Dusty's help. Buford pursues the Bandit, with another local officer who attempts to take charge of the situation. Both police cars are disabled in the chase.

Buford catches up after the Bandit and Dusty stop at a redneck bar to eat. The chase then creates mass chaos in a local town. The Bandit escapes when an 18-wheeler blocks the alleyway where the Bandit sped through. While trying to get the truck out, Buford's car is towed, but he reverses the car and escapes. The tow truck driver chases him, with Junior spinning on the hook. Buford makes the truck flip over, sending Junior flying through the air. Other cars crash into the pile-up.

Buford chases the Bandit in the Mississippi Fairgrounds. Buford's car is thrown up on two side wheels by an incline, but he continues the pursuit while driving on two wheels.

That night, the Bandit and Dusty stop at a hotel called the Come On Inn, where people are involved in an orgy. Buford sees the Bandit's Trans-Am parked there and searches for the fish, which he finds. Buford also thinks he finds the Bandit in the sauna, but it turns out to be a muscular woman who bonds with him.

The next day, one of Buford's tires are blown by the "Enos Devil Darts". The Bandit retakes the fish. Buford pursues on the remaining three tires, first through a herd of cattle, then through parked boats, then a nudist camp, then through a field where the Enoses set off explosions, one of which destroys the car except the engine, seat, and lights, the latter of which Junior is holding above his head.

The Bandit intends to surrender the fish and let Buford win. As Buford collects his money, he sees the Snowman. Thinking he is dealing with the real Bandit, he resists "the Bandit's" (imagined as Burt Reynolds) attempts to sweet-talk him out of capturing him before Junior (in a voiceover) reminds him of what is in store for him if he retires. Buford and the Bandit both separately come to the same conclusion that they need each other in order to have meaning in their lives and the chase resumes, with Buford giving the Bandit a five-minute head start and with the muscular woman joining up with him. Junior is left behind and chases after Buford and the woman, dropping all the money in the process.

Cast
 Jackie Gleason as Montague County Sheriff Buford T. Justice of Texas
 Jerry Reed as Cledus "The Snowman" Snow / "The Bandit"
 Paul Williams as Enos "Little Enos" Burdette
 Pat McCormick as Enos "Big Enos" Burdette
 Mike Henry as Junior Justice
 Colleen Camp as Dusty Trails
 Faith Minton as Tina
 Burt Reynolds as Bo "The Bandit" Darville, The Real Bandit
 Sharon Anderson as Police Woman
 Silvia Arana as Latin Woman
 Alan Berger as Hippie
 Ray Bouchard as Purvis R. Beethoven
 Connie Brighton as Girl #1
 Earl Houston Bullock as Flagman
 Ava Cadell as The Blonde
 Cathy Cahill as Mother Trucker
 David S. Cass Sr. as Local Tough Guy
 Leon Cheatom as Guide
 Candace Collins as French Maid
 Peter Conrad as Midget
 Janis Cummins as Nudist Female
 Jackie Davis as Blackman #1
 Dee Dee Deering as Mrs. Fernbush
 Al De Luca as Flower Vendor
 Raymond Forchion as Tar Worker
 Dick Lowry as Sand Dumper
 Sandy Mielke as Driving Instructor

Production
The film was originally entitled Smokey IS the Bandit, and did not include Jerry Reed in the cast.  Contemporary newspapers refer to original plans to feature Gleason as both "Smokey" and "the Bandit", and Reed's name does not appear in early promotional materials or newspaper accounts during the film's production.  According to some accounts, Jackie Gleason was to play two roles: Sheriff Buford T. Justice and a different "Bandit". The original version was shot in October 1982. Reportedly test audiences reacted poorly, finding Gleason's two roles confusing, so the studio opted to do re-shoots in April 1983.  The Bandit scenes were re-shot with Jerry Reed playing the role. Other accounts indicate that the title was more literal: that Gleason was to play only Sheriff Justice, but the character would also fill the role of "the Bandit", by taking the Enos family's challenge (as Reynolds' character had done in the previous two films). In a teaser trailer for the film (billed as Smokey IS the Bandit), Gleason appears in character as Justice, explaining to the audience that to defeat the Bandit he would adopt the attributes of his prey, "becoming [my] own worst enemy". A publicity still of Gleason apparently shows him in costume as the Bandit.

Soundtrack

Smokey and the Bandit Part 3: Music from the Original Motion Picture Soundtrack was released on vinyl and cassette tape by MCA Records in 1983.

Reception
Smokey and the Bandit Part 3 received negative reviews by critics and the film was generally regarded as the weakest of the three Bandit films in terms of both storyline and revenue. On Rotten Tomatoes, it has an approval rating of 17% based on reviews from six critics.

Janet Maslin of The New York Times gave the film a negative review: "The already skimpy running time of Smokey and the Bandit, Part 3 is padded by an opening montage of earlier Smokey scenes, including shots of Burt Reynolds lounging in a zebra-print hammock. He is grinning, as well he might, because he has been able to sit out Part 3 altogether. What has he missed? An interminable car chase punctuated by dumb stunts and even dumber dialogue, plus the well-worth-missing sight of Paul Williams in a dress". Variety magazine staff wrote: "The sense of fun in that original is missing and the countless smashups and near-misses are orchestrated randomly".

Despite the enormous financial success of the original film (grossing over $300 million on a budget of less than $5 million), coupled with respectable (though significantly lower) numbers generated by the sequel, the third installment was both a critical and box office flop, grossing only $7 million against the film's $9 million production budget.

References

External links
 
 
 
 
 

1983 films
1980s action comedy films
American action comedy films
American sequel films
American chase films
Films about automobiles
1980s road movies
American road movies
Smokey and the Bandit
Universal Pictures films
Trucker films
Films directed by Dick Lowry
1983 comedy films
1980s English-language films
1980s American films